Cymindis cobosi is a species of ground beetle in the subfamily Harpalinae. It was described by Mateu in 1965.

References

cobosi
Beetles described in 1965